The Preston Pipe Bridge carries three water pipes across the River Tees between Ingleby Barwick and Preston-on-Tees in the borough of Stockton-on-Tees, northern England.
The bridge is situated over  upriver from Stockton town centre, and some  upriver from Jubilee Bridge.

Design 

Preston Pipe Bridge is a  span tied arch bridge with concrete abutments and supplies water to southern Teesside.

Construction 

The bridge was built in 1959 by constructor Dowsett to carry two  diameter water pipes across the Tees.
The bridge arch, weighing 200 tonnes was assembled on the Durham bank from prefabricated parts and rolled out across the river on a temporary Bailey bridge, then moved sideways onto its pre-prepared concrete abutments.

Operation 

A third pipe was added in 1979 and there is strictly no public access across the bridge.
The bridge is best accessed on foot from the Jubilee Bridge along the river bank.
The additional third pipe allowed for the removal a nearby single pipe bridge.

References

External links 

 Preston Pipe Bridge on the Bridges on the Tyne website
 Preston Pipe Bridge at Structurae.

Crossings of the River Tees
Bridges completed in 1959
Bridges in County Durham
Bridges in North Yorkshire
Buildings and structures in the Borough of Stockton-on-Tees
Places in the Tees Valley